The 1887–88 season was the 10th season in the history of West Bromwich Albion Football Club. The club reached the FA Cup final for the third successive season and won the competition for the first time, beating Preston North End 2–1. Albion also competed in four local cup competitions, winning the Walsall Senior Cup and West Bromwich Charity Cup and finishing as runners-up in the Birmingham Senior Cup and Staffordshire Senior Cup. Due to a congested fixture list, the club refused to take part in the Birmingham Charity Cup.

FA Cup

West Bromwich Albion began their fifth season in the FA Cup with a 7–1 first round victory against Wednesbury Old Athletic, including a hat-trick from Jem Bayliss. Bayliss also scored the only goal of the second round match away at  Mitchell St George's. Albion defeated Midlands rivals  Wolverhampton Wanderers (2–0) in round three. After receiving a bye in the fourth round, Albion faced Stoke in round five. Bayliss scored all four of Albion's goals in a 4–1 victory, becoming the first Albion player to score four in an FA Cup game. Old Carthusians were defeated 4–2 in the quarter-final.

The semi-final took place at Stoke's Victoria Ground and saw Albion beat Derby Junction 3–0. Goals from Bayliss, Wilson and Woodhall saw Albion reach the final for the third year running.
In the final, the team faced Preston North End at the Kennington Oval in front of 18,904 spectators. Billy Bassett crossed the ball for Bayliss to put Albion ahead, his 10th goal of the competition. Preston equalised just after half-time, but Bassett's pass set up Woodhall for the winning goal and Albion's first major honour. Upon their return to West Bromwich, the players were greeted by thousands of supporters as they drove through the town in a "four-horse brake".

Source for match details:

Birmingham Senior Cup
 
In what was their seventh Birmingham Senior Cup campaign, Albion beat Small Heath Alliance in the first round, with both goals scored by Jem Bayliss. There followed victories over  Burslem Port Vale,  Aston Shakespeare and  Mitchell St. George's. Goals from Joe Wilson and George Timmins were enough to see off Wolverhampton Wanderers in the semi-final, a result that meant that Albion had reached the final without having conceded a goal, and was their third Birmingham Senior Cup final in as many seasons. Pearson scored twice for Albion in the final at Aston Lower Grounds, but it was Aston Villa who ran out winners, by a 3–2 scoreline.

Source for match details:

Staffordshire Senior Cup
West Bromwich Albion recorded their biggest win of the season by defeating Burton Wanderers 12–2 in the first round of the 1887–88 Staffordshire Senior Cup, including hat-tricks from Woodhall and Bayliss.  They then beat Wednesbury Old Athletic (2–1) and Leek (3–2) respectively. The club won away from home for the fourth time in succession when they beat Stoke in the semi-final; a Joe Wilson goal was enough to secure the victory for Albion.

Albion were participating in the competition for the sixth time and aiming to win the trophy for a third season in succession. The final against Wolverhampton Wanderers required two replays to determine a winner: after 0–0 and 1–1 draws, both played at Stoke, Albion lost the second replay 1–2 at home, despite Woodhall's seventh goal of the competition.

Source for match details:

Walsall Senior Cup

West Bromwich Albion usually put out their reserves for the Walsall Senior Cup. However, after two draws against  Oldbury Town in the first round, it was decided that the first team should participate in the second replay. Albion won the match 5–1, before the second team took over once more, beating Walsall Swifts in the final by a 4–1 scoreline.

Source for match details:

West Bromwich Charity Cup

Taking part in the West Bromwich Charity Cup for the first time, Albion defeated Wednesbury Old Athletic 4–1 in the semi-final, which saw "skirmishes" between the two sets of supporters. In the final, the club recorded their second biggest win of the season, beating Great Bridge Unity 10–1.

Source for match details:

Friendlies and benefit matches

With league football yet to be established, West Bromwich Albion played in a number of friendly matches throughout the season.

Source for match details:

See also
1887–88 in English football

Footnotes

References 
Citations

Sources

West Bromwich Albion F.C. seasons
West Bromwich Albion